Aspen Hall may refer to:

 Aspen Hall (Pittsboro, North Carolina), listed on the NRHP in North Carolina
 Aspen Hall (Martinsburg, West Virginia), listed on the NRHP in West Virginia
 Aspen Hall (Harrodsburg, Kentucky), listed on the NRHP in Kentucky

See also 
 Aspen (disambiguation)
 Aspen Hill (disambiguation)